Hilson is a surname. Notable people with the surname include:

Dale Hilson (born 1992), Scottish footballer
Jeff Hilson (born 1966), contemporary British poet
Keri Hilson (born 1982), American singer, songwriter and actress
Marie Hilson Katzenbach (1882–1970), American educator, president of the New Jersey State Board of Education
Archibald Hilson Ross (1821–1900), Member of Parliament from the Otago Region of New Zealand

See also
Hillson
Hillsong (disambiguation)
Hilston
Pilson